This is a list of the German Media Control Top100 Singles Chart number-ones of 1971.

See also
List of number-one hits (Germany)

References
 German Singles Chart Archives from 1956
 Media Control Chart Archives from 1960

1971 in Germany
1971 record charts
1971